Lulama Maxwell Ntshayisa (23 August 195823 July 2021) was a South African politician who was elected to the National Assembly of South Africa at the 2014 general election as a member of the African Independent Congress. He was re-elected in 2019. Ntshayisa died from COVID-19 in 2021.

Parliamentary career
In 2014, Ntshayisa stood for election to the South African National Assembly as second on the national party list of the African Independent Congress. At the May election, he won a seat in the National Assembly. He was sworn in later that month. In June 2014, he was given his committee memberships.

In 2019, he stood for re-election at second on the AIC's national party list again. Ntshayisa was re-elected at the election on May 8, 2019. He was sworn in for a second term as a Member of the National Assembly on May 22. He received his new committee assignments in June 2019.

In April 2021, he became a non-voting member of the Committee for Section 194 Enquiry which will determine Public Protector Busisiwe Mkhwebane's fitness to hold office. He became voting member in June 2021 after the committee's composition was reconstituted to give smaller parties voting rights.

Committee assignments
Portfolio Committee on Agriculture, Land Reform and Rural Development
Portfolio Committee on Basic Education
Portfolio Committee on Employment and Labour
Portfolio Committee on Higher Education, Science and Technology
Portfolio Committee on Sports, Arts and Culture
Committee for Section 194 Enquiry
Disciplinary Committee

Past committee assignments
Portfolio Committee on Agriculture, Forestry and Fisheries
Portfolio Committee on Sport and Recreation 
Portfolio Committee on Rural Development and Land Reform 
Ad Hoc Committee on Police Minister's Report on Nkandla

Death
Ntshayisa died from COVID-19 on 23 July 2021.

References

1958 births
2021 deaths
Place of birth missing
People from the Eastern Cape
Xhosa people
African Independent Congress politicians
Members of the National Assembly of South Africa
Deaths from the COVID-19 pandemic in South Africa